Tobias Santelmann (born August 8, 1980) is a German-born Norwegian actor. He is best known for starring in the Academy Award-nominated film Kon-Tiki (2012). He has also had supporting roles in the films Hercules (2014) and Point Break (2015). He starred in the TV crime drama Grenseland and the television series The Last Kingdom (2015–2018) as well as in Those Who Kill (2021).

Early life
Santelmann was born in Freiburg, Germany. He moved with his family to Norway when he was one year old. He grew up in the far south of Norway in Lindesnes and then later moved to Oslo when he was 16 years old.

Career
Since graduating from the Oslo National Academy of the Arts in 2006, Santelmann worked at The Norwegian Theatre in Oslo. In addition to stage work, Tobias has been  in Norwegian films like Kon-Tiki (2012), Flukt (2012), Jag Etter Vind (Chase the wind) (2013), and Jeg er din (I Am Yours) (2013). Santelmann's film work outside Norway includes supporting performances in the films Hercules (2014) and Point Break (2015), and a starring role in the BBC television series The Last Kingdom (2015-2018). In 2021, he played the role of a serial killer in the mini series Those Who Kill.

In 2020, Santelmann, though relatively unknown in the United States, was chosen to play Prince Olav in the TV series Atlantic Crossing, a joint Norway/US production, alongside Sofia Helin and Kyle MacLachlan.

Selected filmography

References

External links
 

1980 births
Living people
Norwegian male film actors
German emigrants to Norway
People from Lindesnes